The Santa Rosa Church (Dutch: Sint Rosakerk) is a Roman Catholic church located in Paramaribo, Suriname. The current church dates from 1911, and is the second largest church in Paramaribo. It is located in the centre of the city and part of the UNESCO World Heritage Site.

History
In the middle of the 19th century there was a large increase in the number of Catholics in Suriname. The church was dedicated to Rose of Lima.

In 1911, a larger church was built with two towers, and consecrated on 28 June 1911. It is a deep church with a small square in front. The building consists of a high central nave with a flat ceiling, and two side naves, and is painted in the same colour scheme as the Saint Peter and Paul Cathedral.

The organ of the Rosa Church was built by Jos H. Vermeulen and dates from 1929. There are two bells in the left tower. In 1946, the Rosa Church was hit by lightning which caused a hole of several metres in the tower.

In 2020, a restoration of the Rosa Church started, because the building suffered from leakage and barklice. In May 2021, during the restoration, both towers were struck by lightning and damaged.

The clergy house is in use by the boy scouts, and the church is also used as a concert hall.

Gallery

See also
Roman Catholicism in Suriname

References

Buildings and structures in Paramaribo
Roman Catholic churches completed in 1911
Roman Catholic churches in Suriname
Wooden buildings and structures in Suriname